Jana Marie Duggar (born January 12, 1990) is an American television personality. She is known for her appearances on TLC as part of the reality television shows 19 Kids and Counting (2008–2015) and Counting On (2015–2021).

Early life
Duggar was born in Tontitown, Arkansas, with her twin brother, John-David, as the first set of twins in the family and is the second child and first daughter of Jim Bob Duggar and Michelle Ruark. Their parents went on to have a total of 19 children, ten boys and nine girls. She was homeschooled as a child.

Career

Television  
Duggar began her public life as a member of the family featured in the documentary 14 Children and Pregnant Again (2004), which talks about daily life of the family from the "time they wake up" to the "time they go to sleep". The documentary aired on the Discovery Health Channel. Another documentary, Raising 16 Children was produced on the same channel in 2006,  when Duggar's sister Johannah was born.  This was followed by another feature, On the Road with 16 Children about a family cross-country trip.

On September 29, 2008, 19 Kids and Counting (formerly 18 Kids and Counting and 17 Kids and Counting) began as a regular series based on the Duggar family. The show ran until its cancellation in 2015.

Another series, Jill & Jessa: Counting On, starring Jessa and her sister Jill, premiered on December 13, 2015. Various other family members were featured on the show. It followed the Duggars present lives after 19 Kids and Counting was cancelled. The show was cancelled in 2021 following the arrest of Josh Duggar.

Books 
Duggar co-wrote the book Growing Up Duggar: It's All About Relationships with her sisters Jill, Jessa, and Jinger. It was released on March 4, 2014, by Howard Books. The book focuses on life in the Duggar home, their social relationships, and religious beliefs.

Personal life
In 2021, Duggar was charged with a misdemeanor count of endangering the welfare of a minor. She was babysitting when a child wandered outside and was found by a passerby, who called the police. A "not guilty" plea was originally entered; however, Duggar later changed her plea to guilty and paid an $880 fine and other costs, avoiding a trial and potential jail time.

References

1990 births
Living people
Participants in American reality television series
American twins
People from Washington County, Arkansas
Duggar family